Falk Herwig (born 1969) is a Canadian astrophysicist who is known for his researches at the University of Victoria. He has over 200 peer-reviewed articles which brought him an h-index of 37.

Research
In 1998 he and another astrophysicist, Thomas Driebe, described the evolution of helium white dwarfs and two years later published his finding on evolution of convective overshooting of asymptotic giant branch stars. In 1999 he and his colleagues described what happens after the star explodes. He used the PG 1159 star as an example and proved the existence of convective overshooting.

References

External links
Official site of Falk Herwig
Falk Herwig on YouTube

Living people
1969 births
Canadian astrophysicists